Israel competed at the 1964 Summer Olympics in Tokyo, Japan.

Results by event

Athletics

Shooting

Three shooters represented Israel in 1964.

Swimming

References

Nations at the 1964 Summer Olympics
1964 Summer Olympics
Summer Olympics